Parkway (originally proposed as Parkway Circle) is a Manchester Metrolink tram stop built on the line to the Trafford Centre. It is located just east of the Parkway Circle roundabout in Trafford Park and includes a Park & Ride facility. It opened on 22 March 2020.

Services
From this stop a service runs generally every 12 minutes towards Cornbrook and towards the Trafford Centre.

References

External links
Metrolink future network

Tram stops in Trafford
Railway stations in Great Britain opened in 2020